Stanislav Ježík (born 11 February 1972) is a Slovak cross-country skier. He competed in the men's 10 kilometre classical event at the 1998 Winter Olympics.

References

1972 births
Living people
Slovak male cross-country skiers
Olympic cross-country skiers of Slovakia
Cross-country skiers at the 1998 Winter Olympics
People from Dubnica nad Váhom
Sportspeople from the Trenčín Region